"The End Is Where We Begin" is the second single from Our Lady Peace's seventh studio album Burn Burn. The single was released in Canada on September 14.

The music video for "The End Is Where We Begin" was released on October 21, 2009. It premiered on Our Lady Peace's official website.

Charts

References

External links

2009 singles
Our Lady Peace songs
Songs written by Raine Maida
2009 songs